UKPA may refer to:
UK Payments Administration
UK Polocrosse Association
Press Association of the United Kingdom